Eros is a masculine given name. Bearers include:

Footballers
 Eros Bagnara (born 1985), Italian former footballer
 Eros Beraldo (1929–2004), Italian football player and manager
 Eros Dacaj (born 1996), German-Kosovar footballer
 Eros De Santis (born 1997), Italian footballer
 Eros Grezda (born 1995), Albanian footballer
 Eros Maddy (born 2001), Dutch footballer
 Eros Mancuso (born 1999), Argentine footballer
 Eros Medaglia (born 1994), Argentine footballer
 Eros Pérez (born 1976), Chilean former footballer and journalist
 Eros Pisano (born 1987), Italian footballer
 Eros Schiavon (born 1983), Italian footballer

Other
 Eros, a secretary of Roman Emperor Aurelian, whose assassination he masterminded in 275 AD
 Eros Biondini (born 1971), Brazilian politician
 Eros Capecchi (born 1986), Italian former road cyclist
 Eros Correa (born 1993), American boxer
 Eros Djarot (born 1950), Indonesian songwriter, director and politician
 Eros Pagni (born 1939), Italian actor and voice actor
 Eros Ramazzotti (born 1963), Italian singer-songwriter and musician
 Eros Riccio (born 1977), Italian International Correspondence Chess Grandmaster

Masculine given names